Gamasellus alexandrovae is a species of mite in the family Ologamasidae.

References

alexandrovae
Articles created by Qbugbot
Animals described in 1982